Stringtown is a limited-edition live album from Christian rock group Jars of Clay. When released in 1998, it was sold exclusively to members of the Jars of Clay Fan Club. However, since the dissolution of the fan club, the album has been made available through the band's official store.  The two-disc set features a 15-track first disc of live concert performances, while the second disc features multimedia features, videos, and extras.

Track listing (Disc One)
"Blind" - 4:59
"Portrait of An Apology" - 5:12
"Frail" - 7:00
"Fade To Grey" - 3:35
"Flood" - 3:39
"Tea and Sympathy" - 6:00
"Weighed Down" - 4:20
"Worlds Apart" - 9:11
"The Coffee Song" - 3:39
"Sinking" - 4:23
"Liquid" - 5:17
"Overjoyed" - 3:27
"Truce" - 4:36
"Four Seven" - 4:14
"Hymn" - 4:24

References 

Jars of Clay live albums
1998 live albums
Essential Records (Christian) live albums